Cyber Yugadol Nava Yuva Madhura Prema Kavyam is a 2012 Indian Kannada-language film directed by Madhuchandra starring Gurunandan and  Shwetha Srivatsav in lead roles.

Plot 
The film follows the story of a college student named Jayantha (played by Gurunandan) who falls in love with his classmate Sneha (played by Shwetha Srivatsav). Whether or not Jayantha and Sneha survive the hurdles posed by an incident involving their friends and Vishwa, Sneha's brother, forms the rest of the story.

Cast

 Gurunandan as Jayantha
 Shwetha Srivatsav as Sneha
 Sharath Lohithaswa 
 Veena Sundar
 Achyuth Kumar
 Sundar 
 Nanjunda 
 Seetha Kote
 Kiranmayi
 Manojav as Vishwa

Music

Reception

Critical response 

A critic from The Times of India scored the film at 3 out of 5 stars and says "
While Gurunandan and Shwetha Srivastav have displayed an impressive performance as love birds, Kiranmayee and Nanjunda are equally good as lovers turned couples. The highlight of the movie is music by Vasu Dixit and Abhilash Lakra. Cinematography by Manohar Joshi is superb". Srikanth Srinivasa from Rediff.com scored the film at 2 out of 5 stars and wrote "Vasu Dixit's music will go down well with young listeners. Manohar Joshi's camera work is excellent in the song picturisation and especially the number shot in Bali Islands, Indonesia. The film can be appreciated for the freshness of thought and the enthusiasm of the young team, but for nothing else". B S Srivani from Deccan Herald wrote "The director lays bare the merits and demerits of living-in before returning to ideas used in some Telugu films to revive the story. Initially weak, his dialogues secure seetis mingled with admiring gaalis. Vasu and Abhilash rev up the tempo with quirky, pleasing music. A fresher’s attempt, the film is laudable though the entire content is not palatable". Y Maheswara Reddy from DNA wrote "Sharath Lohitasva livens up the screen as well. Music directors Vasu Dixit and Abhilash Lakhra have also done a good job. The film makes a worthy watch for both youth and their parents, so go for it!". A critic from Zee News wrote "Newcomers Gurunandan and Shwetha Srivastav dominate the screen space, but fail to make any impact. But some sequences show that Shwetha can be groomed into a good performer. Veterans Sharath Lohithashwa, Veena Sundar and Nanjunda have given good performances. ‘Cyber Yugadol Navayuva Madhura Prema Kavyam’ tests your patience. Look for a better alternative than watching this film".

Awards 
Filmfare Award for Best Female Debut – South - Shwetha Srivatsav - Won
SIIMA Award for Best Male Debutant - Kannada - Gurunandan - Nominated

References

2010s Kannada-language films
2012 films